Beppe Fenoglio (born Giuseppe Fenoglio 1 March 1922 in Alba (CN) – 18 February 1963 in Turin) was an Italian writer, partisan and translator from English.

The works of Fenoglio have two main themes: the rural world of the Langhe and the Italian resistance movement, both largely inspired by his own personal experiences in them; equally, the writer has two styles: the chronicle and the epos.

Fenoglio was drafted in 1943; before he completed officer school, Italy surrendered to the Allies and Germany attacked and occupied most of Italy. Like most of Italian Army, the training unit of Fenoglio collapsed; he adventurously travelled back home from Rome, and spent months in hiding before joining the partisans in January 1944. After fighting till the end of the war, he translated a number of books from English and wrote the works he is known for while working for a winery in Alba.

His first work was in the neorealist style: La paga del sabato (this was published posthumously too, in 1969). The novel was turned down by Elio Vittorini, who advised Fenoglio to carve out stories and then incorporate them into I ventitré giorni della città di Alba ("The twenty-three days of the city of Alba") (1952). These stories were a chronicle of the Italian partisans or of rural life. One such story was La malora (1954), a long story in the style of Giovanni Verga. His major works were published in a critical edition after his death; controversy remains about his novel Il partigiano Johnny (translated as Johnny the Partisan), first published in 1968, by some considered his best work, which was edited posthumously on the basis of one or both the two incomplete versions left unpublished.

Fenoglio died in Turin, when he was only 40, of bronchial cancer.

Works 
 L'affare dell'anima e altri racconti 
 Appunti partigiani : '44-'45
 Una crociera agli antipodi e altri racconti fantastici
 Un giorno di fuoco
 L'imboscata
 Lettere : 1940-1962
 La paga del sabato
 La voce nella tempesta (theatre drama from Wuthering Heights)
 Il partigiano Johnny. Translated as "Johnny the Partisan", 1995.
 La malora Translated as "Ruin", 1995.
 Primavera di bellezza : romanzo
 Una questione privata. Translated as "A Private Matter", 1988 and "A Private Affair", 2007.
 I ventitré giorni della città di Alba. Translated as "The Twenty-three Days of the City of Alba", 2002.

References

External links
Beppe Fenoglio on Enciclopedia Treccani
Beppe Fenoglio on Encyclopædia Britannica

Italian resistance movement members
1922 births
1963 deaths
People from Alba, Piedmont
Writers from Turin
Italian anti-fascists
Deaths from lung cancer in Piedmont
20th-century Italian novelists
20th-century Italian male writers
Italian male novelists